Elections were held in the organized municipalities in the Thunder Bay District of Ontario on October 22, 2018 in conjunction with municipal elections across the province.

Conmee

Mayor

Source:

Town Council (4 to be elected)

Dorion
Reeve

Town Council (4 to be elected)

Gillies

Reeve

Town Council (4 to be elected)

Greenstone

Mayor

Municipal Council

Source:

Manitouwadge

Mayor

Town Council (4 to be elected)

Source:

Marathon

Mayor

Town Council (4 to be elected)

Neebing

Mayor

Municipal Council

Source:

Nipigon

Mayor

Town Council (4 to be elected)

Source:

O'Connor

Mayor

Town Council (4 to be elected)

Oliver Paipoonge

Mayor

Town Council (4 to be elected)

Red Rock

Mayor

Town Council (4 to be elected)

Source:

Schreiber

Mayor

Town Council (4 to be elected)

Source:

Shuniah

Mayor

Town Council

Terrace Bay

Mayor

Town Council (4 to be elected)

Source:

Thunder Bay

Mayor 

Source:

City council

Current River Ward 

Source:

McIntyre Ward 

Source:

McKellar Ward 

Source:

Neebing Ward

Source:

Northwood Ward

Source:

Red River Ward

Source:

Westfort Ward

Source:

At Large (5 to be elected) 

Source:

English Public School Board Elections

English Catholic School Board Elections

French Public School Board Elections

French Catholic School Board Elections

References 

Thunder Bay
Thunder Bay District